Platon Nguyễn Văn Thành (1922-2003), also known as Thành Nga (Thành Russia), Hai Thành, Platon Thành, born as Platon Aleksandrovich Skrzhinsky (Платон Александрович Скржинский), was a Russian soldier who fought for the communist-led Viet Minh during the First Indochina War. He served in Viet Minh's well-known 307th Battalion active in Southern Vietnam.

Platon Thành returned to Hanoi and then the Soviet Union after the 1954 Geneva Accord. He worked at the Vietnamese Department of Radio Moscow and maintained contacts with his Vietnamese friends, with notable figures of North Vietnam and the unified Vietnam. He once visited Vietnam in 1988 together with old comrades of the 307th Battalion. Platon died in Moscow at the age of 80.

Early life
Platon Aleksandrovich Skrzhinsky was born on 28 March 1922 at Zhytomyr Oblast, Ukraine. He descended from nobility ancestor: Platon's father, Aleksandr Stanislavovich Skrzhinsky, was a Polish noble and a graduate of the Historical and Philological Institute of Prince Bezborodko in Nizhyn who had the certification to teach Latin and Ancient Greek languages. Platon's mother, Anna Alekseevna Skrzhinskaya, was a Russo-Ukrainian noblewomen, had been living in Paris and attended Sorbonne University. Anna was also a proficient piano player. Aleksandr and Anna named their son "Platon" after a Greek word meant "broad-shouldered". Thanks to family's assistance and influence, Platon managed to read many books and literature works of well-known writers. He also became fluent in Russian, France, German, Polish and Ukrainian languages.

Service in the Red Army and prisoner of war
Platon finished highschool in 1940 at the age of 18 and was drafted into the Red Army. Nazi Germany invaded the Soviet Union in the same year and Platon, as a soldier, took part in the Great Patriotic War against the Nazi. Platon was reported to be wounded several times but chose to keep fighting in the frontline rather than have medical recuperation. He served in the Rostov-on-Don, then in Astrakhan, and was sent to the Donbas to participate in the 1942 Second Battle of Kharkov. The battle ended in disaster for the Soviets and Platon was amongst the prisoners of war. He was imprisoned in Nazi facilities at Częstochowa (Poland). In the prison he was forced to perform menial labour, military truck maintenance, and sometimes a translator due to his multilingual capability. Like many other Soviet POWs, Platon suffered from severe mistreatment and malnourishment, resulted in traumas affected his mental health till the end of his life. During the imprisonment, Platon joined a secret anti-Nazi organization who were associated with the Polish partisan. Amongst the member was an anti-war Nazi military officer. In 1944, as the organization's identity was leaked, the anti-war officer arranged its members, including Platon, to be relocated to another prison facility in Denmark. It is also said that USSR's rapid approach to Polish border contributed to the reason for relocation.

The Nazi Germany was defeated in 1945. Platon and Soviet POWs was allowed to return to their homeland. However, due to Platon's good relationship with a French-speaking German warden, he was suspected as a Germany spy. Moreover, under the influence of alcohol, Platon had a heated argument with a NKVD sergeants about roles and activities of Soviet POWs during the war. Feared of misunderstanding and punishment from the Soviet authorities, Platon fled from the prisoner camp. He first arrived at Hamburg and worked for a German busisnessmen. Dissastified with the employer's attitudes towards the poor people, Platon took part in smuggling goods out of the warehouse. The employed soon discovered the affair and sacked him. Platon then moved to Bavaria and worked in a kitchen for U.S. military, he also did not stay long due to conflicts with American personnel whose attitude was considered by Platon as "mockery" and "cynical". He then was employed by a plantation owner in southern France, the job was also short-lived as the employer became insecured about Platon's identity. The French employer nonetheless gave Platon some compensation money and adivised him to join the French Foreign Legion which were recruiting soldiers. Platon accepted the offer to satisfy both his survival needs and his own dream of travelling aboard.

From a French legionnaire to a member of Viet Minh's 307th battalion
As a French legionnaire, Platon and others was sent to southern Vietnam to suppress the resistance war of Viet Minh against French invasion. He first arrived at Saigon, then garrisoned at Vĩnh Long and Bến Tre. Platon was assign the task of the truck drivers and did not directly participate in the punitive military action against Viet Minh. However Platon still witnessed the war crimes and brutality of the French army against Vietnamese people. He also happened to knew that many French legionnaires were actually former SS member with infamous records of war crimes. And then Platon discovered the pictures of communist leaders Lenin, Stalin and Mao Zedong amongst the looted personal belonging of Viet Minh soldiers. He decided to join Viet Minh and assisted their effort against the French invasion. He first secretly smmuggled weapons to the Vietnamese partisans and together with the Vietnameses planned an escape from the French camp. However the plan was exposed due to a traitor and Platon narrowly escaped being convicted as his Vietnamese comrades refuse to reveal Platon's identity to the French authorities. Platon later smmuggled food and rations to the Vietnamese prisoners of war and assisted them in their menial labor, openly told them about his past as a Soviet POW. Platon's kindness to the Vietnameses attracted the attention of a Viet Minh underground agent, and, after several tests of loyalty, the agent helped Platon to escape the French military camp on 17 August 1947.

Platon quickly adapted to his new life as a Viet Minh partisan, under a Vietnamese name: Nguyễn Văn Thành, shortened as Hai Thành or Thành Nga. Platon learned to speak Vietnamese, wore Vietnamese clothes, behaved like a Vietnamese, and get addicted to local Vietnamese cuisine, including the smelly mắm. He actively assisted the Vietnamese in their daily labour. The local Vietnamese had good relationship with Platon, they even gave him more favour and affection due to being sympathized with his unfortunate fate. Being physically strong, Platon usually carried the wounded from the battlefield, and having a Western appearance enabled him to disguised as French officers to lure the French into Vietnamese surprise attacks. After a year Platon's disguse was exposed, he was transferred to Viet Minh's 99th Battalion in Bến Tre, and then joined the famous 307th Battalion, served as a company vice-commander and was entrust with a 60mm mortar, the "blessed" weapon of his unit. He was praised for his bravery and commitment in combat. In 1952 Platon joined the Vietnam Communist Party.

After 1954
After the 1954 Geneva Accord, many Viet Minh cadres and their families, including Platon and his daughter Anna, were relocated to northern half of the country which was under control of the socialist Democratic Republic of Vietnam (DRV). Fluent in both Vietnamese and Russian, Platon worked as a translator on the Soviet ship Stavropol which was tasked to transported them northwards. He later moved to Thanh Hoá with his old wartime comrades, and after ending military service, lived with Anna in Hanoi. For his military merits, Platon was awarded the Order of Glorious Soldier. In Hanoi, Platon and Anna attended an audience hosted by President Hồ Chí Minh and was invited to the presidential palace as guests. Moved by Platon's contribution during the war, president Hồ wrote a letter to the Soviet Union asked for Platon's rehabilitation. Thanks to president Hồ's personal appeal, together with strong support from the DRV authorities, the Soviet government recognized Platon's citizenship and allowed his repatriation. However, Platon was neither recognized as a war veteran nor as a international soldier as Soviet citizen at that time had no requirement for international duties.

Platon and Anna returned to the USSR by train on 10 May 1955, and visited the Red Square in June. They travelled to Berdichev to meet Platon's parents only to find out Anna Alekseevna died long ago and Aleksandr Stanislavovich was murder by the Nazi in 1942. Unemployed and homeless, Platon sent Anna Platonovna to a relative, while himself rented a house in Moskva and worked as a truck driver in the Soviet capital. Thanks to a recommendation of an old friend, Platon was hired by the Vietnamese language Department of the Foreign Radio Broadcasting of Moskva - which was in dire need of Vietnamese speakers - and he worked there for 25 years. He was amongst a very few Russian broadcasters who had a proper Southern Vietnamese accent. Platon personally liked his job as it enabled him to broadcast his anti-war messages and expressed his love for Vietnam and his Vietnamese relatives. He also loved to speak Vietnamese and demanded the Vietnamese guests to talk with him using their mother tongues. He worked as a co-editor of the 1957 Russian - Vietnamese dictionary under the name of P.A. Skrzhinsky. He became a translator after retirement, mostly focused on French literature and some works of Vietnamese writers, and also acted as advisors for Soviet and Russian researchers about Vietnam-related themes. Platon also kept connection with his Vietnamese associates, frequently worked and meet with Vietnamese delegations of government, state, trade union leaders, Writers' Unions, composers, playwrights and artists, and contributed to the works of Soviet/Russia - Vietnam Friendship Association. He and Anna visited Bến Tre, Vietnam during a meeting of the surviving members of 307th Battalion in 1988.

Platon Nguyễn Văn Thành died on 26 March 2003 at Moskva, several days before his 81st birthday.

His funeral was attended by the representative of Vietnam Embassy in Moskva and other Vietnamese associates.

Family
Platon Thành married a French-Vietnamese women named Nguyễn Thị Mai (Collete Mai) in 1948, under the recommendation and arrangement of their Vietnamese associates. They had a daughter, born on 28 August 1949, named Anna Platonovna Skrzhinsky in Russian and Nguyễn Hồng Minh in Vietnamese. She was usually called "Janine" by her family and Platon's friends. Due to wartime circumstance, Collete relocated to Bến Tre city. She remarried a Chinese and had another two children. Collete's remmariage upset both Platon and Collete's mother but Platon respected his wife's decision. Janine lived with Platon after 1954 and she followed in her father's footsteps to work at the Vietnamese Department of Radio Moscow.

References

1922 births

2003 deaths